M66 may refer to:

 M66 (New York City bus), a New York City Bus route in Manhattan
 M-66 (Michigan highway), a state highway in Michigan
 M66 motorway, a motorway in Greater Manchester, England
 Black Magic M66, the classification of a fictional android
 Messier 66, a spiral galaxy in the constellation Leo
 Soltam M-66, a 160 mm mortar manufactured in Israel
 Smith & Wesson Model 66 (S&W M66), a variant of Smith & Wesson Model 19 (S&W M19) revolver